İnan is a Turkish name. It is used as both given name and surname. In the Turkish context the given name Inan is a product of an onomastic-hygiene movement initiated following the formation of the Turkish Republic to replace Arabic name Emin with which it shares common meaning, ‘to believe.’ The other Turkish given name which has the same meaning and was derived as a result of the same process is Inal.

It may refer to:

Surname
 Afet İnan, Turkish historian and sociologist
 Helga Nadire İnan Ertürk (born 1984), Turkish-German women's footballer
 Kâmran İnan, Turkish politician
 Kerem İnan, Turkish footballer
 Selçuk İnan, Turkish footballer
 Serkan İnan, Swedish basketball player
 Umran Inan, Turkish scientist

Given name
 Abu Inan Faris, Marinid ruler

References

Inan
Turkish masculine given names